Village Creek may refer to:

Rivers
Village Creek, the lower stretch of Marin Creek in Alameda County, California
Village Creek (Allamakee County, Iowa), an immediate tributary of the Upper Mississippi River
Village Creek (Missouri), a stream in Missouri
Village Creek (Texas), a tributary of the Neches River
Village Creek (Tarrant County) Texas, a stream in North Texas

Other
 Village Creek (Norwalk, Connecticut), a community